Through Thick and Thin is a 1927 American silent crime film directed by B. Reeves Eason and starring William Fairbanks, Ethel Shannon and George Periolat.

Cast
 William Fairbanks as 	Don Davis
 Ethel Shannon as Ruth Morris
 Jack Curtis as 'Red' Grimley
 George Periolat as James Morris
 Ina Anson as Rita
 Eddy Chandler as Bull 
 Fred Behrle as Mike

References

Bibliography
 Connelly, Robert B. The Silents: Silent Feature Films, 1910-36, Volume 40, Issue 2. December Press, 1998.
 Munden, Kenneth White. The American Film Institute Catalog of Motion Pictures Produced in the United States, Part 1. University of California Press, 1997.

External links
 

1927 films
1927 crime films
American silent feature films
American crime films
Films directed by B. Reeves Eason
American black-and-white films
Gotham Pictures films
1920s English-language films
1920s American films